Ben Tameifuna (pronounced ; born ) is a New Zealand born rugby union player who plays for the Tonga national rugby union team and 	Bordeaux Bègles in French Top 14. Tameifuna was a member of Tonga's 31-man 2019 Rugby World Cup squad.

He plays club rugby for the French team Racing 92, having previously played for the Chiefs in Super Rugby and Hawke's Bay Magpies in the ITM Cup. In 2012 he became the Chiefs first choice tighthead prop. He is also acknowledged for his ability to fill in at hooker.

Career

Tameifuna made his Hawke Bay's debut as a teenager in 2010. He represented the New Zealand under 20s at the 2011 IRB Junior World Championship, and in March 2012 he made his Chiefs debut after an injury sidelined Ben Afeaki. In 2013, he signed a contract extension with the Chiefs until 2014.

In May 2012 he was selected for the All Blacks to train for the three Test series against Ireland. At over 130 kg, he was the heaviest member of the All Black squad. Tameifuna was not capped for New Zealand.

Tameifuna made his international debut for Tonga against Wales on 16 June 2017. Tameifuna was first in their squad for the 2016 European tour but was not capped on that tour.

After four years with the Chiefs, in June 2015 Tameifuna signed with Racing 92, who changed their name from Racing Metro in the same month.  They are based in Paris and are part of the French Top 14.

On 14 May 2020, Tameifuna left Racing 92 to sign for French rivals Bordeaux from the 2020–21 season.

Relatives
Tameifuna's uncle Sona Taumalolo was another Chiefs prop, who also played for Tonga at the 2011 Rugby World Cup.
In July 2012, with hooker Mahonri Schwalger from Samoa, the two props combined for 60 minutes to help the Chiefs beat the Crusaders 20–17, at Waikato Stadium in Hamilton. When Tameifuna signed to play in France, Taumalolo was already playing there, for FC Grenoble.

Honours
 Racing 92
Top 14: 2015–16

References

External links 
Chiefs profile
Yahoo NZ profile
IRB JWC profile
itsrugby.co.uk profile

1991 births
New Zealand rugby union players
New Zealand sportspeople of Tongan descent
Chiefs (rugby union) players
Hawke's Bay rugby union players
Waikato rugby union players
Racing 92 players
Rugby union props
Rugby union players from Auckland
Living people
New Zealand expatriate rugby union players
New Zealand expatriate sportspeople in France
Expatriate rugby union players in France
Tonga international rugby union players